Keaton Nankivil (born January 18, 1989) is a former basketball player from the United States. He last played for Orlandina Basket of the Italian Serie A.

He played four seasons for the Wisconsin Badgers. In 2011, he moved to Germany to play professionally. Nankivil played three seasons with ratiopharm Ulm; in his last one, he averaged 6 points and 3.6 rebounds. He signed with Rio Natura Monbús in the 2014 offseason.

References

1989 births
Living people
American expatriate basketball people in Germany
American expatriate basketball people in Italy
American expatriate basketball people in Latvia
American expatriate basketball people in Spain
Basketball players from Wisconsin
BK VEF Rīga players
Liga ACB players
Obradoiro CAB players
Orlandina Basket players
Power forwards (basketball)
Ratiopharm Ulm players
Sportspeople from Madison, Wisconsin
Wisconsin Badgers men's basketball players
American men's basketball players